Sir Thomas Peter Anderson Stuart (20 June 1856 – 29 February 1920) was a Scottish-born professor of physiology, founder of the medical school at the University of Sydney.

Early life
Stuart was born in Dumfries, Scotland in 1856, son of Alexander Stuart, a master clothier & tailor, a magistrate and a member of the town council; and his wife Jane, née Anderson. Stuart was educated at Dumfries Academy until 14 years of age and was then apprenticed to a pharmacist. Stuart soon passed the preliminary examination of the Pharmaceutical Society, and at 16 the minor examination which entitled him to registration as a chemist when he turned 21.

University of Edinburgh, first marriage 
Stuart decided to take up medicine, and working early in the morning and at night passed the preliminary examination at the University of Edinburgh. Stuart spent a year at Wolfenbüttel, Germany, studying French and German; in November 1875 Stuart returned to Scotland where in 1880 he graduated as a Doctor of Medicine. Stuart commenced his course at the University of Edinburgh and had one of the most brilliant careers in medicine ever known there. Stuart was awarded 10 medals and won other prizes and scholarships. During Stuart's course Lister was bringing in his revolutionary changes in the treatment of surgery cases, and the young student had the opportunity of working under both the old and new methods. Stuart completed his course in 1880, with first-class honours, degrees of M.B., C.M.,  and the Ettles scholarship. Stuart was asked by Professor William Rutherford to become his chief demonstrator; in preparation for this he made further studies in physiology and chemistry at Strasburg. A year later, Stuart returned to Edinburgh, took up his duties as demonstrator, and qualified for the degree of M.D. in 1882. On 21 November 1882 Stuart married Elizabeth (Lizza) Ainslie.

University of Sydney

It was decided to institute a medical school at the University of Sydney in 1882 and applications were invited for the chair of anatomy and physiology. Nominations were also requested from competent bodies, and the Royal College of Surgeons, London, the University of Edinburgh, the Royal College of Surgeons of Edinburgh, and the Royal College of Physicians and Surgeons of Glasgow, all nominated Stuart. Stuart was appointed and arrived in Sydney with his wife aboard the Parramatta in March 1883. The only medical school building was one of four rooms, damp and unplastered, and a curriculum had to be prepared and arrangements made for lecturers, demonstrators and attendants. There were only four students in the first year, but Stuart had the imagination to realize the immense possible development of the school, and was soon working out ideas for a new building.

Creation of the medical school at University of Sydney 
In June 1884 the University had agreed to build a permanent medical school and plans were drawn up by James Barnet, the government architect. Plans were approved in November 1884, the government allocated £15,000 towards its construction in 1885. Around that time, Stuart's marriage to Lizza Ainsley ended in separation, after which he went to stay with his friend Robert Scot Skirving. Lizza later died of a morphia overdose on February 28, 1886.

In 1889, the building was substantially completed; interior fitting was finalised in 1892. The building is regarded as a masterpiece of Gothic Revival architecture The number of students in the medical school had increased from 6 in 1883 to 604 in 1912. Now that the medical building was complete, Stuart was able to focus on other things including in bringing about great improvements in the university grounds. Stuart also prepared a bibliography of scientific literature in the libraries of New South Wales. Stuart was a good judge of men, and among the afterwards distinguished men who acted as demonstrators and lecturers in his department were Sir Alexander McCormick, Professor James Thomas Wilson, Sir James Graham, Sir Charles James Martin, Sir Almroth Wright and Professor Henry George Chapman. When Stuart's chair was divided in 1890 he retained physiology, and Wilson was appointed to the new professorship of anatomy.

Travel to Europe
In 1890, while on a visit to Europe, Stuart was asked by the government to go to Berlin and report on Dr Robert Koch's method of treating tuberculosis. The resulting report was an extremely able piece of work. Stuart could not regard the lymph as a successful curative agent, but he recognized that a great field of research had been opened up, which would probably lead to very valuable work being done not only with tuberculosis but with other diseases. During another visit to Europe in 1891, Stuart made further inquiries but could only conclude that the Koch treatment was a failure. On Stuart's return, he was asked to become a member of the board of health; and from 1893–96, was medical adviser to the government and president of the Board of Health, the dual offices carrying a salary of £1030 a year. Some objection was made to Stuart undertaking these positions while still a full-time officer of the University. A public service board having been constituted it ruled that though Stuart was a highly efficient officer he should give his whole time to the government positions. Stuart decided to resign as president, but continued to be a member of the board for the remainder of his life. On 18 September 1894, Stuart married Dorothy Primrose, a relative of Lord Rosebery.

Royal Prince Alfred Hospital and late life
Stuart found time to do some public lecturing and took an active interest in the Royal Prince Alfred Hospital. In 1901, Stuart became chairman, and it was largely due to his abilities that this hospital became the largest general hospital in Australia. In 1901, Stuart was responsible for the opening of a department of dentistry at the University. In 1905, Stuart became the inaugural president of the United Dental Hospital of Sydney, in doing so, he had to overcome the opposition of American-trained dentists led by Henry Peach. Later that year, he was appointed the first president of the Australasian Massage Association (later renamed the Australian Physiotherapy Association).

In 1908, Stuart was involved in the founding of the Institute of Tropical Medicine at Townsville and in 1914, he was created a knight bachelor. He was a supporter of Francis Galton and the Eugenics Education Society. Early in 1919, he became ill and an exploratory operation disclosed that his abdominal cancer was hopeless. That same year, he gave his last lecture which was attended by his son, Bouverie. With great courage, he continued to carry out his work to as late as January 1920, and he died on at his home in Double Bay on 29 February 1920. He held the Dean of Medicine position since 1883 till his death. Lady Stuart and their four sons (two of whom later became medical practitioners) survived him. Stuart's portrait by Sir John Longstaff is at the National Gallery, Sydney. Marble busts of Stuart by James White are held by the Royal Prince Alfred Hospital and by the University of Sydney.

A granddaughter Lady (Primrose) Potter was named after his second wife.

Legacy
Until 1960, the old Medical School building was called the Barnet-Vernon-Wilkinson Old Medical School Building. It was then renamed the Anderson Stuart Building in recognition for Stuart's contribution to the Medical School. The building has an engraving of his arms and initials, AS, on the eastern main entrance.

Personal life
Anderson Stuart was a tall man; his prominent nose gave him the nickname 'Coracoid', from the Latin corax, a crow. Stuart was an excellent lecturer, a first-rate teacher and had a keen business sense. At times, Stuart made enemies and he was not always willing to listen to the opinions of others. Anderson Stuart was an active Freemason, serving as the Deputy Grand Master of the United Grand Lodge of New South Wales.

References

1856 births
1920 deaths
People from Dumfries
Australian people of Scottish descent
Scottish physiologists
Australian physiologists
Knights Bachelor
Alumni of the University of Edinburgh
Academic staff of the University of Sydney